Jeanne Moreau (23 January 1928 – 31 July 2017) was a French actress, singer, screenwriter, director, and socialite. She made her theatrical debut in 1947, and established herself as one of the leading actresses of the Comédie-Française. Moreau began playing small roles in films in 1949, later achieving prominence with starring roles in Louis Malle's Elevator to the Gallows (1958), Michelangelo Antonioni's La Notte (1961), and François Truffaut's Jules et Jim (1962). Most prolific during the 1960s, Moreau continued to appear in films into her 80s. Orson Welles called her "the greatest actress in the world".

She won the Cannes Film Festival Award for Best Actress for Seven Days... Seven Nights (1960), the BAFTA Award for Best Foreign Actress for Viva Maria! (1965), and the César Award for Best Actress for The Old Lady Who Walked in the Sea (1992). She was also the recipient of several lifetime achievement awards, including a BAFTA Fellowship in 1996, a Cannes Golden Palm in 2003, and another César Award in 2008.

Early life and education 
Moreau was born in Paris, the daughter of Katherine (née Buckley), a dancer who performed at the Folies Bergère (d. 1990), and Anatole-Désiré Moreau, a restaurateur (d. 1975). Moreau's father was French; her mother was English, a native of Oldham, Lancashire, England and of part Irish descent. Moreau's father was Catholic and her mother, originally a Protestant, converted to Catholicism upon marriage. When Jeanne was a young girl, "the family moved south to Vichy, spending vacations at the paternal ancestral village of Mazirat, a town of 30 houses in a valley in the Allier. "It was wonderful there", Moreau said. "Every tombstone in the cemetery was for a Moreau". During World War II, the family was split, and Moreau lived with her mother in Paris. Moreau ultimately lost interest in school and, at age 16, after attending a performance of Jean Anouilh's Antigone, found her calling as an actor. She later studied at the Conservatoire de Paris. Her parents separated permanently while Moreau was at the conservatory and her mother, "after 24 difficult years in France, returned to England with Jeanne's sister, Michelle."

Career 
In 1947, Moreau made her theatrical debut at the Avignon Festival. She debuted at the Comédie-Française in Ivan Turgenev's A Month in the Country and, by her 20s, was already one of the leading actresses in the theatre's troupe. After 1949, she began appearing in films with small parts but continued primarily active in the theatre for several years — a year at the Théâtre National Populaire opposite among others Gérard Philipe and Robert Hirsch, then a breakout two years in dual roles in The Dazzling Hour by Anna Bonacci, then Jean Cocteau's La Machine Infernale and others before another two-year run, this time in Shaw's Pygmalion. From the late 1950s, after appearing in several successful films, she began to work with the emerging generation of French film-makers. Elevator to the Gallows (1958) with first-time director Louis Malle was followed by Malle's The Lovers (Les Amants, 1959).

Moreau went on to work with many of the best known New Wave and avant-garde directors. François Truffaut's New Wave film Jules et Jim (1962), her biggest success internationally, is centered on her magnetic starring role. She also worked with a number of other notable directors such as Michelangelo Antonioni (La notte and Beyond the Clouds), Orson Welles (The Trial, Chimes at Midnight and The Immortal Story), Luis Buñuel (Diary of a Chambermaid), Elia Kazan (The Last Tycoon), Rainer Werner Fassbinder (Querelle), Wim Wenders (Until the End of the World), Carl Foreman (Champion and The Victors), and Manoel de Oliveira (Gebo et l'Ombre).

In 1983, she was head of the jury at the 33rd Berlin International Film Festival. In 2005, she was awarded with the Stanislavsky Award at the 27th Moscow International Film Festival.

Moreau was also a vocalist. She released several albums and once performed with Frank Sinatra at Carnegie Hall in 1984. In addition to acting, Moreau worked behind the camera as a writer, director and producer. Her accomplishments were the subject of the film Calling the Shots (1988) by Janis Cole and Holly Dale. She appeared in Rosa von Praunheim's film Fassbinder's Women (2000).

Personal life 

Throughout her life, Moreau maintained friendships with prominent writers such as Jean Cocteau, Jean Genet, Henry Miller, and Marguerite Duras, (an interview with Moreau is included in Duras's book Outside: Selected Writings). She formerly was married to Jean-Louis Richard (1949–1964, separated in 1951), and then to American film director William Friedkin (1977–1979). She and Richard had a son, Jérôme. Director Tony Richardson left his wife Vanessa Redgrave for her in 1967, but they never married. She also had relationships with directors Louis Malle and François Truffaut, fashion designer Pierre Cardin, and the Greek actor/playboy Theodoros Roubanis.

In 1971, Jeanne Moreau was a signatory of the Manifesto of the 343 which publicly announced that she had obtained an illegal abortion.

Moreau was a close friend of Sharon Stone, who presented a 1998 American Academy of Motion Pictures life tribute to Moreau at the Samuel Goldwyn Theater, academy headquarters, in Beverly Hills. Orson Welles called her "the greatest actress in the world", and she remained one of France's most accomplished actresses.

In 2009, Moreau signed a petition in support of director Roman Polanski, who had been detained while traveling to a film festival in relation to his 1977 sexual abuse charges, which the petition argued would undermine the tradition of film festivals as a place for works to be shown "freely and safely", and that arresting filmmakers traveling to neutral countries could open the door "for actions of which no-one can know the effects."

Moreau died on 31 July 2017 at her home in Paris at the age of 89. Her body was discovered by her cleaning maid and shortly before her death, she said she felt "abandoned".

Filmography

Actress

Director 
 Lumière (1976)
 L'Adolescente (1979)
 Lillian Gish (1983, TV documentary)

Awards and nominations

Films

Theater

References

External links 

 Jeanne Moreau Biography on newwavefilm.com
 
 

1928 births
2017 deaths
BAFTA fellows
Best Foreign Actress BAFTA Award winners
Best Actress César Award winners
French television actresses
French people of English descent
French people of Irish descent
European Film Awards winners (people)
Cannes Film Festival Award for Best Actress winners
César Honorary Award recipients
Honorary Golden Bear recipients
French women film directors
French women singers
French film actresses
French film directors
Actresses from Paris
Members of the Académie des beaux-arts
Musicians from Paris
French women screenwriters
French screenwriters
Conservatoire de Paris alumni
20th-century French actresses
21st-century French actresses
Troupe of the Comédie-Française
French National Academy of Dramatic Arts alumni
Burials at Montmartre Cemetery
Because Music artists
Signatories of the 1971 Manifesto of the 343